The Dr. Harry F. Moniba Foundation (HFMF) was a 501(c)(3) U.S. nonprofit public charity, described by its directors as promoting Moniba's legacies of nonviolence and public service integrity. The foundation supported programs fighting illiteracy and raising the standard of living for Liberians. As of June 2015, the organization went through reorganization and ceased to exist in that current form. The Foundation reapplied as the Moniba Foundation with the Internal Revenue Service and was granted legal nonprofit status in November 2014.

References

Foundations based in the United States
Foreign charities operating in Liberia